Shivaun Plozza is an Australian author of books for children and young adults. She also works as an editor, manuscript assessor and illustrator.

Biography 
Plozza grew up in regional Victoria, Australia. Plozza's debut novel, Frankie won several awards including the Davitt Award, High Commendation from the Victorian Premier's Literary Awards, a Children's Book of the Year Award: Older Readers Notable Book Award, and was listed as one of the Top Ten Best Fiction for Young Adults in 2019 by the Young Adult Library Services Association. Her second novel, Tin Heart was inspired by her brother's liver transplant.

Plozza also helped establish the grass-roots digital platform Oz Authors Online which was founded in 2020 to host YA Fiction author events in response to COVID-19 restrictions.

Bibliography

Novels 
 Frankie (2016)
 Tin Heart (2018)
 The Boy, The Wolf and the Stars (2020)
 A Reluctant Witch's Guide to Magic (2022)

Short fiction 
 “The Point” in Where The Shoreline Used To Be, edited by Susan La Marca and Pam Macintyre (2016)
 “The Challenge” in Speccy-tacular Footy Stories (2018)

Awards and honours 
 2019 - Star - Kirkus Review: Tin Heart 
 2019 - Top Ten Best Fiction - American Library Association: Frankie
 2019 - Highly Commended - Victorian Premier's Literary Award; Writing for Young Adults: Tin Heart
 2017 - Shortlisted - Book of the Year: Older Readers: Frankie
 2017 - Notable - Book of the Year Older Readers: Frankie
 2017 - Highly Commended - Victorian Premier's Literary Award: Writing for Young Adults: Frankie
 2017 - Winner - Sisters in Crime Australia's Davitt Award (YA Category): Frankie
 2017 - Shortlisted - Book for the Gold Inky Award: Frankie

Fellowships 
 2019 May Gibbs Fellowship 2019
 2018 Bundanon Trust - Artist in Residence
 2015 Varuna Residential Fellowship
 2014 Glenfern Fellowship

References

External links 
Official website

Australian women children's writers
Living people
Year of birth missing (living people)
21st-century Australian women writers